Joan Winifred Joslin ( Glover, 11 March 1923 – 8 February 2020) was a British codebreaker at Bletchley Park during World War II.

Joan Glover was born on 11 March 1923. She was ordered to Bletchley Park on 24 December 1941. After six weeks learning to use Hollerith machines for code-breaking, she worked during the war to decrypt messages from Japanese airplanes and German ships. Her work helped locate and sink the German battleship Scharnhorst.

Joslin met her husband at her first day of work at the facility; they became engaged three years later, in 1944 and married after the war finished. Her cryptography work remained a secret until the mid-1970s. Joslin was interviewed as part of the Bletchley Park Oral History Project in May 2014.

Joslin died in Essex on 8 February 2020, at the age of 96.

References

1923 births
2020 deaths
Bletchley Park people
Bletchley Park women